Recalada a Bahía Blanca Light, also known as Monte Hermoso Light or simply Recalada Light (lit. landfall), is an active lighthouse in Monte Hermoso, Buenos Aires Province, Argentina, marking the entrance to the Bahía Blanca. At a height of  it is the eleventh-tallest "traditional lighthouse" in the world, as well as the tallest lighthouse in the Southern Hemisphere and the tallest lighthouse built of metal in the lattice tower configuration

History 
The tower was prefabricated in France by the same company that built the Eiffel Tower.  It was first lit on 1 January 1906.

In 1928 a Dalén light was installed. The light was replaced with an electric light 1974. An Automatic Identification System (AIS) beacon was installed on 1 January 2006.

Construction 
It consists of a central cylinder of iron,  in diameter and eight cast-iron columns. There are a total of 331 steps.

Visiting 
The light station is staffed and the tower is open to guided tours.

See also
 List of tallest lighthouses in the world
 List of lighthouses in Argentina

References

External links

List of Lighthouses in Argentina Servicio de Hidrografía Naval

Lighthouses completed in 1906
Lighthouses in Argentina
Buildings and structures in Buenos Aires Province
1906 establishments in Argentina